The Adventures of Arsène Lupin is a 1957 French crime film directed by Jacques Becker. It was entered into the 7th Berlin International Film Festival. It was followed by Signé Arsène Lupin.

Plot
The film narrates the adventures of Arsène Lupin, the famous character of the gentlemen burglar conceived by Maurice Leblanc in 1905. The story is set in Paris at the end of the nineteenth century, where the cunning thief managed to mock the prefect of police, Kaiser Wilhelm II and Baroness Von Kraft, who had been fascinated by his gallantry and his legendary shrewdness.

Cast
 Robert Lamoureux as André Larouche / Arsène Lupin / Aldo Parolini
 Liselotte Pulver as Mina von Kraft
 O. E. Hasse as Kaiser Wilhelm II
 Daniel Ceccaldi as Jacques Gauthier
 Georges Chamarat as Inspecteur Dufour
 Huguette Hue as Léontine Chanu
 Renaud Mary as Paul Desfontaines
 Sandra Milo as Mathilde Duchamp
 Paul Muller as Rudolf von Kraft
 Henri Rollan as Le Président du Conseil Emile Duchamp
 Margaret Rung as The English woman
 Charles Bouillaud as Otto
 Hubert de Lapparent as Jewellery salesman
 Pierre Stéphen as Clérissy
 Jacques Becker as The kronprinz
 Paul Préboist as The groom

References

External links
 

1957 films
1957 crime films
1950s heist films
Arsène Lupin films
Films directed by Jacques Becker
French crime films
1950s French-language films
Italian crime films
French heist films
Cultural depictions of Wilhelm II
Films with screenplays by Albert Simonin
1950s French films
1950s Italian films